Perkins is a populated place in Howard County, Arkansas, at an elevation of 541 feet. It is located about 13 miles east-southeast of Dierks, Arkansas, just east of Arkansas State Highway 369.

Perkins is a rail connection point.  It is served by the Union Pacific, and it is at Perkins that the UP interchanges with another line, the De Queen and Eastern Railroad. 

Howard County Airport (FAA ID: M77) is located about 9 miles south.

References

Populated places in Arkansas
Populated places in Howard County, Arkansas